Hermann Fischer may refer to:

 Hermann Fischer (general) (1894–1968), Generalleutnant in the Wehrmacht during World War II
 Hermann Emil Fischer (1852–1919), German chemist
 Hermann Fischer (athlete) (1912–1984), German wrestler and Communist resistance fighter
 Hermann Willibald Fischer (1896–1922), German mechanical engineer
 Hermann Fischer (banker) (1873–1940), German banker